Continental Courts is a mobile home park and census-designated place (CDP) in Centre County, Pennsylvania, United States. It was first listed as a CDP prior to the 2020 census.

The CDP is in central Centre County, in the west part of Benner Township. It is bordered to the south by Pennsylvania Route 550, which leads northeast  to Bellefonte, the county seat, and southwest  to Stormstown.

The community is in the valley of Buffalo Run, which flows northeast to Spring Creek at Bellefonte and is part of the Bald Eagle Creek watershed leading to the West Branch Susquehanna River.

Demographics

References 

Census-designated places in Centre County, Pennsylvania
Census-designated places in Pennsylvania